The following is a list of episodes for the British sitcom My Family, that aired on BBC One from 19 September 2000 to 2 September 2011.

Series overview

Episodes

Series 1 (2000)

Series 2 (2001)

Series 3 (2002)

Series 4 (2003)

Series 5 (2004–05)

Series 6 (2006)

Series 7 (2007)

Series 8 (2008)

Series 9 (2009)

Series 10 (2010)

Series 11 (2011)

Comic Relief special
A special five-minute sketch, titled "The Erroneous Storm", was included as part of Comic Relief and broadcast on 11 March 2005. The story takes place during a thunderstorm in which, after being scared, Michael and Janey join Ben and Susan in their bedroom. They are soon joined by Nick who, thanks to now being a party reviewer, brings with him Adam Hart-Davis, Anthony Head, Myleene Klass, Nell McAndrew, Dermot Murnaghan, Clive Russell and Jamie Theakston. It was directed by Dewi Humphreys and written by James Hendrie and Ian Brown. The short special attracted 10.94 million viewers.

Notes

References

External links
My Family: Episode Guide at the British Comedy Guide

BBC-related lists
Lists of British LGBT-related television series episodes
Lists of British sitcom episodes